The Rosselin Glacier is a glacier flowing southwest from the southern extremity of the Rouen Mountains into Palestrina Glacier in the northern portion of Alexander Island, Antarctica. The glacier was first surveyed by the British Antarctic Survey in 1975–76. The feature was named by the United Kingdom Antarctic Place-Names Committee in late 1980 after F. Rosselin, Chief Engineer, FAE, 1908–10, in association with other FAE names in this area.

See also
 List of glaciers in the Antarctic
 Coulter Glacier
 Gerontius Glacier
 Paulus Glacier
 

Glaciers of Alexander Island